Cell Biochemistry & Function is a peer-reviewed scientific journal published by Wiley-Blackwell. Its 2010 impact factor is 1.651. The journal was established in 1983 and the full archive is available online. The journal covers research on the molecular and biochemical mechanisms controlling cellular activity.

Abstracting and indexing 
Cell Biochemistry & Function is abstracted and indexed in:

External links 
 

Biochemistry journals
Molecular and cellular biology journals
Publications established in 1983
Wiley-Blackwell academic journals
English-language journals